NCIS is an American police procedural television series, revolving around a fictional team of special agents from the Naval Criminal Investigative Service combining elements of the military drama and police procedural genres. The concept and characters were initially introduced in two episodes of the CBS series JAG (season eight episodes 20 and 21: "Ice Queen" and "Meltdown"). A spin-off from JAG, the series premiered on September 23, 2003, on CBS. To date it has entered into the twentieth full season and has gone into broadcast syndication on the USA Network. Donald P. Bellisario and Don McGill are co-creators and executive producers of the premiere member of the NCIS franchise. , NCIS is the third-longest-running scripted, non-animated U.S. primetime TV series currently airing, surpassed only by Law & Order: Special Victims Unit (1999–present) and Law & Order (1990–2010; 2022–present); it is the 7th-longest-running scripted U.S. primetime TV series overall.

The series originally had the partly redundant title Navy NCIS: Naval Criminal Investigative Service; this was later shortened to NCIS: Naval Criminal Investigative Service and then to NCIS. In season six, a two-part episode led to a spin-off series, NCIS: Los Angeles. A two-part episode during the eleventh season led to a second spin-off series, NCIS: New Orleans. Though initially slow in the ratings, barely cracking the Top 30 in the first two seasons, the third season showed progress, consistently ranking in the top 20, and by its sixth season, it became a top-five hit, having remained there since. In 2011, NCIS was voted America's favorite television show in an online Harris Poll. The series finished its tenth season as the most-watched television series in the U.S. during the 2012–13 network television season. NCIS is on its 20th season.

Premise
NCIS is an American police procedural drama television series, revolving around a fictional team of special agents of the Major Case Response Team from the Naval Criminal Investigative Service, the primary federal law enforcement agency of the United States Department of the Navy, which investigates criminal activities involving the United States Navy and United States Marine Corps and their families. Based at the Washington Navy Yard in Washington, D.C., the NCIS team was led until late season 18 by Supervisory Special Agent Leroy Jethro Gibbs, a former Marine Corps gunnery sergeant Scout Sniper and a skilled investigator. Supervisory Special Agent Alden Parker, a former FBI special agent, now leads the team.

Cast and characters

 Mark Harmon as NCIS Supervisory Special Agent Leroy Jethro Gibbs (seasons 1–19)
 Sean Harmon as young  Leroy Jethro Gibbs
 Sasha Alexander as NCIS Special Agent Caitlin Todd (main role: seasons 1–2; guest role: season 3)
 Michael Weatherly as NCIS Senior Field Agent Anthony DiNozzo (seasons 1–13)
 Pauley Perrette as NCIS Forensic Specialist Abby Sciuto (seasons 1–15)
 David McCallum as Dr. Donald "Ducky" Mallard (seasons 1–present)
Adam Campbell as young Donald "Ducky" Mallard
 Sean Murray as NCIS Senior Field Agent Timothy McGee (recurring role: season 1, main: season 2–present)
 Cote de Pablo as NCIS Special Agent Ziva David (main: seasons 3–11; guest: season 3 & 16; recurring: season 17)
 Lauren Holly as NCIS Director Jenny Shepard (recurring: season 3; main: seasons 3–5)
 Rocky Carroll as NCIS Director Leon Vance (recurring: season 5; main: season 6–present)
 Brian Dietzen as Dr. Jimmy Palmer (recurring: seasons 1–5, also starring: seasons 6–9, main: season 10–present)
 Emily Wickersham as NCIS Special Agent Eleanor Bishop (guest: season 11; main: seasons 11–18)
 Wilmer Valderrama as NCIS Special Agent Nicholas Torres (season 14–present)
 Jennifer Esposito as NCIS Special Agent Alexandra Quinn (season 14)
 Duane Henry as NCIS International Desk Agent Clayton Reeves (guest: season 13; main: seasons 14–15)
 Maria Bello as NCIS Special Agent and Psychologist Dr. Jacqueline Sloane (seasons 15–18)
 Diona Reasonover as NCIS Forensic Specialist Kasie Hines (recurring: season 15; main: season 16–present)
 Katrina Law as NCIS Special Agent Jessica Knight (guest: season 18; main: season 19–present)
 Gary Cole as NCIS Supervisory Special Agent Alden Parker (season 19–present)

Only David McCallum as Dr. Donald "Ducky" Mallard has been credited to every episode since the show's inception.

Episodes

Backdoor pilots

JAG
Two episodes of JAG season 8, "Ice Queen" and "Meltdown", serve as the backdoor pilot of NCIS itself.

These JAG episodes introduced the characters of Jethro Gibbs, Anthony DiNozzo, Vivian Blackadder, Abby Sciuto, and Donald "Ducky" Mallard.

Patrick Labyorteaux appears on NCIS reprising his JAG role as Lt. Bud Roberts in the first-season episode "Hung Out to Dry", in the fourteenth-season episode "Rogue", and in the season fifteen episode "Dark Secrets"; Alicia Coppola returned as Lt. Cmdr. Faith Coleman in "UnSEALed", "Call of Silence", and "Hometown Hero", while Adam Baldwin returned as Cmdr. Michael Rainer in "A Weak Link", and John M. Jackson appeared as retired Rear Admiral A. J. Chegwidden in the season ten episode "Damned If You Do".

NCIS: Los Angeles
The two-part NCIS season 6 episode "Legend" serves as the backdoor pilot of NCIS: Los Angeles.

"Legend" introduces Chris O'Donnell as G. Callen, LL Cool J as Sam Hanna, Daniela Ruah as Kensi Blye, and Barrett Foa as Eric Beale.

Rocky Carroll recurs on NCIS: Los Angeles as his NCIS character Director Leon Vance, while Pauley Perrette has appeared twice as Abby, and Michael Weatherly has appeared once as Anthony DiNozzo. NCIS guest stars reprising roles between series include David Dayan Fisher as CIA Officer Trent Kort, in the season finale of NCIS: Los Angeles; Kelly Hu as Lee Wuan Kai in NCIS: Los Angeles and later in an episode of NCIS.

John M. Jackson has appeared on NCIS: Los Angeles as his JAG character Admiral A. J. Chegwidden, while this series has also crossed over with Hawaii Five-0 and Scorpion.

NCIS: New Orleans
The two-part NCIS season 11 episode "Crescent City" serves as the backdoor pilot of NCIS: New Orleans.

"Crescent City" introduces Scott Bakula as Dwayne Pride, Lucas Black as Christopher LaSalle, Zoe McLellan as Meredith Brody, and CCH Pounder as Loretta Wade.

Rocky Carroll recurs as Director Leon Vance, while NCIS series regulars Mark Harmon, Michael Weatherly, Pauley Perrette, Sean Murray, Emily Wickersham, Wilmer Valderrama, David McCallum and Brian Dietzen have all appeared as their NCIS characters. NCIS recurring cast members Meredith Eaton, Joe Spano, Diane Neal, and Leslie Hope have all guest-starred on NCIS: New Orleans.

Production

Name
Before the launch of the first season, advertisements on CBS identified the show as "Naval CIS". By the time of the launch of the first episode, NCIS was airing under the name Navy NCIS, the name it held for the entire first season. Since the "N" in NCIS stands for "Naval", the name "Navy NCIS" was redundant. The decision to use this name was reportedly made by CBS, over the objections of Bellisario, who preferred the old title because he felt it would:
 Attract new viewers (particularly those of JAG), who might not know the NCIS abbreviation
 Distinguish between NCIS and the similarly themed and similarly spelled CBS series CSI and its spinoffs. (The original title, for instance, was often misquoted and parodied as "Navy CSI", something the show itself referenced in the first episode.)

Development
In 2011, NCIS was voted America's favorite television show in an online Harris Poll. NCIS finished its tenth season as the most-watched television series in the U.S. during the 2012–13 network television season. Diona Reasonover joined the main cast in season sixteen, following the departures of Duane Henry and Pauley Perrette. NCIS was renewed for a seventeenth season on April 11, 2019, which premiered on September 24, 2019, and for an eighteenth season in May 2020. The season premiered on November 17, 2020.

Flair
From the season two episode "Lt. Jane Doe" onwards, the series began showing two-second-long black-and-white clips. These clips (called "phoofs") are shown at the beginning of every segment depicting the last two seconds of that segment, a segment being the five or six portions of the show meant to be separated by commercials. Additionally, starting with the season three premiere, "Kill Ari (Part I)," a freeze-frame shot was also used at the very end of most episodes as well.

Crew changes
It was reported in May 2007 that Donald P. Bellisario would be stepping down from the show. Due to a disagreement with series star Mark Harmon, Bellisario's duties as showrunner/head writer were to be given to long-time show collaborators, including co-executive producer Chas. Floyd Johnson and Shane Brennan, with Bellisario retaining his title as executive producer. In fall 2009, Gary Glasberg joined the crew and became the new "day-to-day" runner of NCIS because Shane Brennan had to focus on his new show, the spin-off NCIS: Los Angeles. On September 28, 2016, Glasberg died in his sleep at the age of 50.

Release

Broadcast
NCIS airs on Network Ten and TV Hits (formerly TV1) in Australia, Global (syndicated on sister channels Showcase and Lifetime) in Canada, TV3 and The Box in New Zealand, Seriale+ (premieres), TVN (free-TV premieres), TVN7 (reruns), AXN (reruns), (India) Fox Crime, Star World India (Pakistan) ARY Digital, ARY Zindagi, TVOne Pakistan and TV Puls (reruns) in Poland, Disney+ Hotstar and Rock Entertainment in Southeast Asia, CBS Justice, Channel 5 and 5USA in the United Kingdom, M6 in France, RTÉ2 in Ireland, Rai 2 in Italy, and Ion Television in USA.

Home media

The first 17 seasons of NCIS have been released in Regions 1, 2, and 4. In Germany (Region 2), seasons 1–4 and 5–8 were released in two separate sets for each season. The first-season DVD omits the two introductory episodes from season eight of JAG, though they are featured on the JAG season eight DVD.

Other releases
In 2010, CBS Interactive and GameHouse released a mobile video game, NCIS: The Game for iOS, Android, BlackBerry, Windows Mobile, and BREW/J2ME.  The game features five different cases written by the show's writers.

On November 1, 2011, Ubisoft released a video game adaption of NCIS for the PC, Xbox 360, PlayStation 3, and Wii. A Nintendo 3DS version was released on March 6, 2012. The video game was deemed as a mockery of the show by reviewers and players alike, and received a 2/10 rating on GameSpot.

There is also a Facebook and mobile game called NCIS: Hidden Crimes.

TV movies

Soundtrack

CBS Records released the show's first soundtrack on February 10, 2009. The Official TV Soundtrack is a two-disc, 22-track set that includes brand new songs from top artists featured prominently in upcoming episodes of the series, as well as the show's original theme by Numeriklab (available commercially for the first time) and a remix of the theme by Ministry. The set also includes songs performed by series regulars Pauley Perrette and Coté de Pablo.

A sequel to the soundtrack was released on November 3, 2009. NCIS: The Official TV Soundtrack; Vol. 2 is a single-disc, 12-track set that covers songs (many previously unreleased) featured throughout the seventh season of the show, including one recording titled "Bitter and Blue" by Weatherly, as well as two songs used in previous seasons.

Reception
In 2016, The New York Times reported that NCIS "is most popular in rural areas", especially in rural Maine and Pennsylvania.

Broadcast ratings
Seasonal rankings (based on average total viewers per episode) of NCIS.

 Note: Each U.S. network television season starts in late September and ends in late May, which coincides with the completion of May sweeps.

 Since season 7, NCIS has been the most watched scripted show on American television; in the 2012–13 season it was the most watched program of the past year, surpassing both American Idol and NBC Sunday Night Football, which had ranked above it the previous three seasons.
 On January 15, 2013, NCIS surpassed its previous series high in viewers, with the season ten episode "Shiva" attracting 22.86 million viewers.

Franchise

NCIS has produced three spin-offs: NCIS: Los Angeles (2009–), NCIS: New Orleans (2014–2021) and NCIS: Hawaiʻi (2021–).

NCIS: Los Angeles

In November 2008, it was reported that a first spin-off series set in Los Angeles would be introduced with a two-part backdoor pilot during the sixth season of NCIS. The episode title "Legend (Part I)" and "Legend (Part II)", airing on April 28, 2009, and May 5, 2009. In May 2009, CBS picked up an NCIS spin-off series with the title NCIS: Los Angeles.

The series stars Chris O'Donnell as Special Agent G. Callen, LL Cool J as Special Agent Sam Hanna, Louise Lombard as Special Agent Lara Macy, Peter Cambor as Operational Psychologist Nate Getz, and Daniela Ruah as Special Agent Kensi Blye. Following the official pick-up by CBS, it was confirmed that Lombard would not continue her role as Special Agent Lara Macy. Linda Hunt and Adam Jamal Craig were added the cast as OSP Manager Henrietta Lange and Special Agent Dom Vail respectively. Craig, would not be returning for second season and was replaced by Eric Christian Olsen as Marty Deeks promoted to series regular.

Characters from NCIS have appeared in the spin-off. Rocky Carroll portrayed Leon Vance in a recurring role, and Pauley Perrette portrayed Abby Sciuto, with a guest appearance in the season 1 episodes "Killshot" and "Random on Purpose".

NCIS: Los Angeles was created by Shane Brennan. In April 2011, NCIS creator Donald Bellisario sued CBS over NCIS: Los Angeles because of his contract which gave him "first opportunity" to develop a spin-off or sequel; the lawsuit was dismissed by a judge in June 2012. However, discussions continued between CBS and Bellisario, and in January 2013 the dispute was settled outside of court a week before it was set to go to trial; the terms of the agreement were not disclosed but were described as being amicable.

NCIS: New Orleans

In September 2013, reported that a second spin-off series set in New Orleans would be introduced with a two-part backdoor pilot during the eleventh season of NCIS. The episode title "Crescent City (Part I)" and "Crescent City (Part II)". The episodes were filmed in February 2014, and aired on March 25, 2014, and April 1, 2014. NCIS star Mark Harmon and showrunner Gary Glasberg are the executive producers of the series. Glasberg discussed the idea of the episode with Harmon, who said "That's more than a sweeps episode" (meaning an episode with provocative subject manner and top appeal for television ratings). The premise for the episodes are, according to Glasberg, "all about this tiny little NCIS office that's down [in New Orleans], and the kind of cases that they come across". In May 2014, CBS picked up an NCIS second spin-off series with the title NCIS: New Orleans.

The series stars Scott Bakula as Special Agent Dwayne Cassius Pride, Lucas Black as Special Agent Christopher LaSalle, Zoe McLellan as Special Agent Meredith "Merri" Brody, Rob Kerkovich as Sebastian Lund, and CCH Pounder as Dr. Loretta Wade. Daryl "Chill" Mitchell, Shalita Grant and Vanessa Ferlito joined the main cast later, portrayed as computer specialist Patton Plame, Special Agent Sonja Percy, and Special Agent Tammy Gregorio, respectively.

NCIS and NCIS: New Orleans have had two crossovers.
 "Sister City" (season 13): Abby's brother is suspected of poisoning the passengers and crew of a private plane flying from New Orleans to Washington, D.C.
 "Pandora's Box" (season 14): A theoretical terror playbook is stolen and put up for auction on the black market when Abby's homeland security think tank is compromised.

NCIS: Hawaiʻi 

On February 16, 2021, it was reported that a spin-off set in Hawaii was in the works from NCIS: New Orleans executive producers Christopher Silber and Jan Nash.  On April 23, 2021, it was announced that CBS had given the production a straight-to-series order to the spin-off, and intended to include the franchise's first female lead character. The show debuted on CBS on September 20, 2021, with Vanessa Lachey in the leading role.

NCIS: Sydney 

On February 16, 2022, it was reported that a spin-off set in Sydney, Australia, was in the works.  NCIS: Los Angeles producer Shane Brennan will be attached to the project. The series will be the first international spin-off for the NCIS franchise, and will feature local Australian actors and producers.  It will air on Network 10 in Australia, and be available for streaming worldwide on Paramount+ in 2023.

Awards and nominations

NCIS has received many awards and nominations since it premiered on September 23, 2003, including the ALMA Awards, ASCAP Awards, BMI Film & TV Awards, Emmy Awards, and People's Choice Awards.

References

Further reading
 Carter, Bill. "Behind a Quiet Little Hit, a Reliable Hit Maker." New York Times 10/25/2005, Vol. 155 Issue 53378, pE1-E7 about Donald P. Bellisario.
 Coyne, Kate. "Mark Harmon: Built to Last" People  3/4/2019, Vol. 91 Issue 10, p40-46
 Gallagher, Thomas. "Sins of the Father: NCIS and the Family at Work." Journal of Popular Culture 49.4 (2016): 875–896.
 Hagan, Molly. "Pauley Perrette" Current Biography (Oct 2014), Vol. 75 Issue 10, p49-54. 
 Hust, Stacey J.T., et al. "Law & Order, CSI, and NCIS: The association between exposure to crime drama franchises, rape myth acceptance, and sexual consent negotiation among college students." Journal of Health Communication 20.12 (2015): 1369–1381.

External links

 
 
 

 
2000s American crime drama television series
2000s American police procedural television series
2003 American television series debuts
2000s American legal television series
2010s American crime drama television series
2010s American police procedural television series
2010s American legal television series
2020s American crime drama television series
2020s American police procedural television series
2020s American legal television series
American action television series
American military television series
American television spin-offs
CBS original programming
English-language television shows
Nielsen ratings winners
Television series by CBS Studios
Television series created by Donald P. Bellisario
Television shows about the United States Marine Corps
Television shows adapted into video games
Television shows featuring audio description
Television shows set in Washington, D.C.